The 1938 Australian Championships was a tennis tournament that took place on outdoor Grass courts at the Memorial Drive, Adelaide, Australia from 21 January to 31 January. It was the 31st edition of the Australian Championships (now known as the Australian Open), the 7th held in Adelaide, and the first Grand Slam tournament of the year. The singles titles were won by Americans Don Budge and Dorothy Bundy Cheney.

Finals

Men's singles

 Don Budge defeated  John Bromwich  6–4, 6–2, 6–1

Women's singles

 Dorothy Bundy defeated  Dorothy Stevenson  6–3, 6–2

Men's doubles

 John Bromwich /  Adrian Quist defeated  Gottfried von Cramm /  Henner Henkel 7–5, 6–4, 6–0

Women's doubles

 Thelma Coyne /  Nancye Wynne defeated  Dorothy Bundy /  Dorothy Workman 9–7, 6–4

Mixed doubles

 Margaret Wilson /  John Bromwich defeated  Nancye Wynne /  Colin Long 6–3, 6–2

External links
 Australian Open official website

1938
1938 in Australian tennis
January 1938 sports events